The following radio stations broadcast on FM frequency 98.9 MHz:

Argentina
 CONTEMPORANEA, desde Jose C. Paz.
 Activa in Concordia, Entre Ríos
 Si in Rosario, Santa Fe
 Radio de Folklore in Córdoba
 Apuntes in Santos Lugares, Buenos Aires
 Total in Paso de los Libres, Corrientes
 Opción in Ingeniero Budge, Buenos Aires
 Revolución in La Plata, Buenos Aires
 Futuro in Pres. Roque Saenz Peña, Chaco
 Nihuil in Mendoza
 La 100 Formosa in Formosa
 Lider in Ingeniero Maschwitz, Buenos Aires
 Argentina in Neuquén
 La Golosa in Moreno, Buenos Aires
 989 in Saladillo, Buenos Aires
 La Voz Del Pueblo in Posadas, Misiones
 Metro Mar del Plata in Mar del Plata, Buenos Aires
 Encuentro in Mocoretá, Corrientes
 Ciudad in General Pico, La Pampa
 Ades in Lamadrid, Buenos Aires

Australia
 Radio National in Griffith, New South Wales
 Triple J in Wollongong, New South Wales
 ABC Classic FM in Yulara, Northern Territory
 Triple J in Geraldton, Western Australia
3NOW in Moreland, Victoria

Canada (Channel 255)
 CBQY-FM in Nipigon, Ontario
 CFCP-FM in Courtenay, British Columbia
 CFPV-FM in Pemberton, British Columbia
 CFYK-FM in Yellowknife, Northwest Territories
 CHCD-FM in Simcoe, Ontario
 CHIK-FM in Quebec City, Quebec
 CHYC-FM in Sudbury, Ontario
 CIGV-FM-1 in Keremeos, British Columbia
 CIKT-FM in Grande Prairie, Alberta
 CILR-FM in Lloydminster, Saskatchewan/Alberta
 CIZL-FM in Regina, Saskatchewan
 CIZZ-FM in Red Deer, Alberta
 CJFX-FM in Antigonish, Nova Scotia
 CJLF-FM-3 in Huntsville, Ontario
 CJRG-FM-7 in Cloridorme, Quebec
 CJYC-FM in Saint John, New Brunswick
 CKLC-FM in Kingston, Ontario
 VF2206 in Kemano, British Columbia

Cayman Islands
ZFKV-FM at Georgetown

China 
 CNR Music Radio in Nanjing
 CNR The Voice of China in Tianshui and Yibin

El Salvador
YSTN at El Salvador

Malaysia
 Minnal FM in Ipoh, Perak
 Zayan in Malacca & North Johor

Mexico
 XHACB-FM in Ciudad Delicias, Chihuahua
 XHAMO-FM in Irapuato, Guanajuato
 XHCHAL-FM in Chalco, State of Mexico
 XHCMN-FM in Ciudad del Carmen, Campeche
 XHDU-FM in Durango, Durango
 XHERL-FM in Colima, Colima
 XHERO-FM in Aguascalientes, Aguascalientes
 XHESP-FM in Mazapil, Zacatecas
 XHJD-FM in Monterrey, Nuevo León
 XHMORE-FM in Tijuana, Baja California
 XHMPM-FM in San Blas (Los Mochis), Sinaloa
 XHNGO-FM in Huauchinango, Puebla
 XHNX-FM in Toluca, Estado de México
XHPBJZ-FM in Juchitán de Zaragoza, Oaxaca
XHPIXT-FM in Asunción Nochixtlán, Oaxaca
 XHSCBS-FM in Tarandacuao, Guanajuato
 XHSCGV-FM in Jarácuaro Erongarícuaro Municipality, Michoacán
 XHWB-FM in Veracruz, Veracruz
 XHYW-FM in Mérida, Yucatán

New Zealand
Today FM at Wellington

Portugal
 Radio Nova (FM) in Oporto

United States (Channel 255)
  in Great Falls, Montana
 KBQS-LP in Sacramento, California
 KCOQ in Steamboat Springs, Colorado
  in Columbia, California
  in Saint Robert, Missouri
 KFMG-LP in Des Moines, Iowa
 KGRA in Jefferson, Iowa
 KHHT in Mettler, California
  in Essex, California
 KIOM-LP in Kaunakakai, Hawaii
  in Kapaa, Hawaii
 KKMG in Pueblo, Colorado
  in Kearney, Nebraska
  in Spokane, Washington
  in Dilley, Texas
 KLOW in Reno, Texas
  in Snyder, Texas
 KMKB-LP in Marfa, Texas
 KMRW-LP in Springdale, Arkansas
 KNLW-LP in Rochester, Minnesota
 KOGQ-LP in Oak Grove, Louisiana
 KPIH-LP in Payson, Arizona
 KPNW-FM in Seattle, Washington
  in Parkersburg, Iowa
 KQQF in Coffeyville, Kansas
  in Leavenworth, Kansas
 KRME-LP in College Station, Texas
 KRQX-FM in Hurricane, Utah
 KRSM-LP in Minneapolis, Minnesota
  in Hornbrook, California
  in Dinuba, California
 KSOL in San Francisco, California
  in Duluth, Minnesota
 KTEH-LP in Los Molinos, California
 KTUT in Crowell, Texas
  in Carthage, Texas
 KURA-LP in Ouray, Colorado
 KUTX in Leander, Texas
 KWCP-LP in Little Rock, Arkansas
  in Chester, California
 KXNZ in Wheeler, Texas
 KXYM-LP in Belcourt, North Dakota
 KYIS in Oklahoma City, Oklahoma
  in Anchorage, Alaska
 KZLQ-LP in La Quinta, California
  in Paynesville, Minnesota
 KZXK in Doney Park, Arizona
  in Brooksville, Mississippi
  in Lebanon, Tennessee
 WAWM in Petoskey, Michigan
 WAXT-LP in Whitehall, Michigan
  in Montgomery, Alabama
  in Murdock, Florida
 WBYR in Woodburn, Indiana
  in Rochester, New York
  in Tallahassee, Florida
 WCLZ in North Yarmouth, Maine
  in Elkins, West Virginia
 WDXM-LP in Newburgh, Indiana
 WEMP in Two Rivers, Wisconsin
  in Marco, Florida
  in Neoga, Illinois
 WHYP-LP in Corry, Pennsylvania
 WISH-FM in Galatia, Illinois
  in Dwight, Illinois
 WKIM in Munford, Tennessee
 WLFV in Midlothian, Virginia
  in Rock Island, Illinois
 WLXB in Bethel, North Carolina
 WLYJ in Quitman, Mississippi
 WMKP-LP in Oakwood, Georgia
  in Orlando, Florida
  in Youngstown, Ohio
  in Chatsworth, Georgia
 WNNI in Adams, Massachusetts
 WNRW in Prospect, Kentucky
 WOFE in Byrdstown, Tennessee
  in Burlington, Vermont
 WOLR-LP in Williamsport, Pennsylvania
 WOOS-LP in Schenectady, New York
  in Webster, Massachusetts
  in Vassar, Michigan
  in Emporium, Pennsylvania
  in Millersburg, Pennsylvania
 WRHE-LP in Dayton, Tennessee
  in Salisbury, Maryland
  in Paintsville, Kentucky
  in Spartanburg, South Carolina
 WTMZ-FM in McClellanville, South Carolina
 WTOH in Upper Arlington, Ohio
  in Philadelphia, Pennsylvania
 WUUU in Franklinton, Louisiana
  in Tomah, Wisconsin
 WVOY-LP in Jefferson, South Carolina
 WWGA in Tallapoosa, Georgia
 WYRZ-LP in Brownsburg, Indiana
 WZOL in Vieques, Puerto Rico

References

Lists of radio stations by frequency